The Journal of Evidence-Based Medicine is a quarterly peer-reviewed medical journal covering evidence-based medicine. It was established in 2008 and is published by John Wiley & Sons on behalf of the Chinese Cochrane Centre, of which it is the official English-language journal. It grew out of a decade of work by editors of the Chinese Journal of Evidence Based Medicine to create a new journal with a global audience. The editors-in-chief are You-Ping Li (West China Medical Center) and Mike Clarke (Queen’s University Belfast). According to the Journal Citation Reports, the journal has a 2021 impact factor of 6.224, ranking it 33rd out of 172 journals in the category "Medicine, General & Internal".

References

External links

Wiley (publisher) academic journals
Publications established in 2008
Quarterly journals
English-language journals
Evidence-based medicine
General medical journals